Manuel María de Arjona (1771–1820) was a Spanish poet and writer.

Bibliography

External links
 

Spanish male writers
1771 births
1820 deaths